William Chatalas (June 1, 1907 – February 1986) was an American politician in the state of Washington. He served in the Washington House of Representatives from 1961 to 1975.

References

1986 deaths
1907 births
Democratic Party members of the Washington House of Representatives
20th-century American politicians